Poecilasthena nubivaga is a moth in the family Geometridae. The species was described by Prout in 1932. It is found on Borneo.

References

Moths described in 1932
Poecilasthena
Moths of Asia